The Snowtown murders (also known as the bodies in barrels murders) were a series of murders committed by John Justin Bunting, Robert Joe Wagner and James Spyridon Vlassakis between August 1992 and May 1999, in and around Adelaide, South Australia. A fourth person, Mark Haydon, was convicted for helping to dispose of the bodies. The trial was one of the longest and most publicised in Australian legal history.

Most of the bodies were found in barrels in an abandoned bank vault  in Snowtown, South Australia, hence the names given in the press for the murders. Although motivation for the murders is unclear, the killers were led by Bunting to believe that the victims were paedophiles, homosexuals, or "weak". In the case of some victims, the murders were preceded by torture, and efforts were made to appropriate victims' identities, social security payments and bank accounts.

Although initially the notoriety of the murders led to a short-term economic boost from tourists visiting Snowtown, it created a stigma, with authorities considering a change of the town's name and identity. The case has been chronicled in numerous books as well as a film adaptation released in 2011 to critical acclaim.

Investigation
Initially, the body of Clinton Trezise was found at Lower Light in 1994, although no connection to Bunting was made at this time. Similarly, the death of Thomas Trevilyan in 1997 was initially treated as a suicide. It was police inquiries into Elizabeth Haydon's disappearance which eventually led them to Snowtown, and on 20 May 1999, the remains of eight victims were found by the South Australian Police in six plastic barrels in a disused bank vault. For this reason, the murders were dubbed the "bodies in barrels murders".

It is believed that the bodies had been held in several locations in South Australia before being moved to Snowtown in 1999. Prosecutors believe that the killers moved the bodies after they became aware of the ongoing police investigation. Two more bodies were found buried in the backyard of Bunting's house in Adelaide. Police later arrested and charged Bunting, Wagner and Mark Haydon on 21 May 1999 for the murders (Vlassakis was arrested later, on 26 May 1999). At the time of the arrest, Vlassakis lived in Bunting's home.

Trials and verdicts
The trial of Bunting and Wagner lasted almost twelve months, the longest in the history of South Australia. In December 2003, Bunting was convicted of committing eleven murders, and Wagner of ten murders, of which he had confessed to only three. Vlassakis pleaded guilty to four of the murders. In 2004, Haydon was convicted on five counts of assisting with the murders (of which he admitted to two). The jury did not come to a decision on two murder charges against Haydon, and another charge of assisting murder, at which the senior prosecutor, Wendy Abraham, indicated that she would seek a retrial on those charges. The final count against Bunting and Wagner—that of murdering Suzanne Allen—was dropped on 7 May 2007, when a jury had been unable to reach a verdict.

Justice Brian Ross Martin determined that Bunting was the ringleader, and sentenced him to 11 consecutive terms of life imprisonment without the possibility of release on parole. Wagner was sentenced to 10 consecutive terms under the same conditions, and at his sentencing, he stated from the dock: "Paedophiles were doing terrible things to children. The authorities didn't do anything about it. I decided to take action. I took that action. Thank you." Vlassakis was sentenced to four consecutive life sentences with a non-parole period of 26 years and Haydon was sentenced to 25 years with non-parole period of 18 years.

More than 250 suppression orders prevented publication of the details of this case. In early 2011, a judge lifted the remaining orders in response to a request by the producers of the film Snowtown, a dramatisation depicting the murders and the events leading up to them.

Victims
 Clinton Trezise, 22, killed 31 August 1992, body found 16 August 1994
 Ray Davies, 26, killed December 1995, body found 26 May 1999
 Suzanne Allen, Bunting's ex-girlfriend, 47, died November 1996, body found 23 May 1999 (perpetrators were tried but not found guilty as a result of a hung jury; her case was never tried again, but it is believed she was likely a victim of Bunting)
 Michelle Gardiner (Born Michael Gardiner), 19, killed September 1997, body found 20 May 1999
 Vanessa Lane (Born Barry Lane), Wagner's ex-partner, 42, killed October 1997, body found 20 May 1999
 Thomas Trevilyan Vanessa Lane's last partner, 18, killed 5 November 1997, body found 5 November 1997 in Kersbrook
 Gavin Porter, Vlassakis's friend, 29, killed April 1998, body found 20 May 1999
 Troy Youde, Vlassakis's half-brother, 21, killed August 1998, body found 20 May 1999
 Frederick Brooks, 18, killed September 1998, body found 20 May 1999
 Gary O'Dwyer, 29, killed October 1998, body found 20 May 1999
 Elizabeth Haydon, Mark Haydon's wife and Frederick Brooks's aunt, 37, killed 21 November 1998, body found 20 May 1999
 David Johnson, Vlassakis's stepbrother, 24, killed 9 May 1999, body found 20 May 1999

Perpetrators
Several individuals were involved in the murders: John Bunting, Robert Wagner and Mark Haydon were all charged with the killings; additionally, James Vlassakis pleaded guilty to four murders and provided testimony in exchange for a lesser sentence.

John Justin Bunting (born 4 September 1966 in Inala, Queensland) was found to be the leader of the perpetrators. When he was 8 years old, Bunting was beaten and sexually assaulted by a friend's older brother. He is reported to have "enjoyed weaponry, photography and anatomy," and grew to develop a strong hatred of paedophiles and homosexuals. At age 22, Bunting worked at an abattoir and reportedly "bragged about slaughtering the animals, saying that's what he enjoyed the most". Bunting moved to a house in Salisbury North, South Australia in 1991 and befriended his neighbours Mark Haydon and Robert Wagner.

Robert Joe Wagner (born 28 November 1971 in Parramatta, New South Wales) was befriended by Bunting in 1991. Bunting encouraged Wagner to assist in the various murders.

James "Jamie" Spyridon Vlassakis (born 24 December 1979), along with his mother and half-brother, lived with Bunting and was gradually drawn into helping with the murders. Vlassakis, 23, helped torture and kill his own half-brother, Troy Youde, and his stepbrother, David Johnson. He confessed in 2001 to four murders, including Johnson's, and became a key witness for the Crown. The detail he provided, supported by other evidence, helped convict Bunting and Wagner. Vlassakis was sentenced in 2002 to a minimum of 26 years and is held in isolation in an unidentified South Australia prison.

Mark Ray Haydon (born 4 December 1958), an associate of Bunting, was initially the subject of "suppression orders or statutory provisions prohibiting publication" and could not therefore be identified as anything other than an alleged perpetrator. In January 1999, he reportedly rented the abandoned state bank building at Snowtown. A jury deadlocked on the murders of Haydon's wife, Elizabeth Haydon, and of Troy Youde. The murder charges were not retried when Haydon pleaded guilty to helping the serial killers dispose of the bodies of Elizabeth and Youde.

Community impact

The notoriety of the murders led to a short-term economic boost from tourists visiting Snowtown, but created a lasting stigma. The Age reported in 2011 that Snowtown would be "forever stigmatised" due to its association with the murders. Shortly after the discovery of the bodies in Snowtown, the community discussed changing the name to "Rosetown", but no further actions were taken. , one shop in Snowtown was selling souvenirs of the murders "cashing in on Snowtown's unfortunate notoriety".

The house in Salisbury North where Bunting lived and buried two bodies was demolished by its owner, the South Australian Housing Trust. The other place in Murray Bridge has been sold. The bank, with a four-bedroom attached house, was placed on auction in February 2012 but only reached half its reserve price of $200,000. After holding an open house which raised $700 for charity through charging an entrance fee, the property sold later that year on 27 September for just over $185,000 with the new owners intending to live in the house while running a business from the bank. A plaque will be installed to commemorate the victims.

Since the Snowtown murders, the small farming town has become a grim destination for tourists seeking to explore the dark stories associated with the crimes. As a result, Snowtown has become something of a tourist attraction, bringing in a variety of individuals who seek to explore the dark stories related to the town. The region, still a quaint farming town, has become a landmark associated with the 12 murders committed in the 1990s. Tourists that come through Snowtown are often there because of the murders, and may ignore other problems facing the town–for instance, poverty, rural isolation, etc. As the true crime industry has become increasingly popular, Snowtown has become increasingly well known. Ultimately, the increased attention on Snowtown, as a result of the Snowtown murders, creates additional pressure on the community. With a decline in economic opportunities, the population of Snowtown has been left with continued trauma and social stigma.

In media

Film
Snowtown, also known as The Snowtown Murders, a feature film based upon the life of John Bunting, was released in Australia on 19 May 2011.

Music
Australian comedian Eddie Perfect wrote a demo song for "Snowtown the Musical" intended to be screened at the 2011 Inside Film Awards that he was hosting. The song was not broadcast.

Jason Whalley and Lindsay McDougall of punk band Frenzal Rhomb formed a short lived acoustic band named Self Righteous Brothers, releasing an album in 2005 containing the song 'There's No Town Like Snowtown'.

Books
Books detailing the crimes include: 
 Marshall, Debi: Killing for Pleasure: The Definitive Story of the Snowtown Serial Murders, 
 Mitchell, Susan: All Things Bright and Beautiful: Murder in the City of Light, 
 McGarry, Andrew: Snowtown Murders: The Real Story Behind the Bodies in the Barrels Killings, 
 Pudney, Jeremy: Snowtown: The Bodies in Barrels Murders: The Grisly Story of Australia's Worst Serial Killings, 
 Cawthorne, Nigel: The Mammoth Book of New CSI: 31 New Real-Life Crime Scene Investigations,

Documentaries
Crimes That Shook Australia – Series 3 Episode 01: "Snowtown: The Bodies in the Barrels Murders" – aired 18 February 2018.
Crime Investigation Australia – Series 1 Episode 09: "Snowtown: Bodies in the Barrels" – aired 2005
Casefile True Crime Podcast – "Case 19: Snowtown" – 14 May 2016
City of Evil – Series 1 Episode 02 – aired 16 September 2018

See also
 Deaths of Karlie Pearce-Stevenson and Khandalyce Pearce
 List of serial killers by country

References

Further reading

 (by the author of the book The Snowtown Murders)
 
Casefile True Crime Podcast - Case 19: Snowtown – 14 May 2016

1992 murders in Australia
1990s in South Australia
Cannibalism in Oceania
Murder in Adelaide
People murdered in South Australia
Serial murders in Australia
Violence against gay men
Violence against LGBT people
Violence against trans women